Dorcadion mosqueruelense is a species of beetle in the family Cerambycidae. It was described by Escalera in 1902. It is known from Spain.

Subspecies
 Dorcadion mosqueruelense var. clarior Breuning, 1947
 Dorcadion mosqueruelense var. diversicolor Breuning, 1947
 Dorcadion mosqueruelense var. glabrocostatum Nicolas, 1909
 Dorcadion mosqueruelense var. internefasciatum Breuning, 1947
 Dorcadion mosqueruelense var. prolongatum Pic, 1908
 Dorcadion mosqueruelense var. pseuduhagoni Breuning, 1948
 Dorcadion mosqueruelense var. teruelense Breuning, 1948
 Dorcadion mosquerulense var. carbonarium Nicolas, 1904

See also 
Dorcadion

References

mosqueruelense
Beetles described in 1902